The National Film and Sound Archive of Australia (NFSA), known as ScreenSound Australia from 1999 to 2004, is Australia's audiovisual archive, responsible for developing, preserving, maintaining, promoting and providing access to a national collection of film, television, sound, radio, video games, new media, and related documents and artefacts. The collection ranges from works created in the late nineteenth century when the recorded sound and film industries were in their infancy, to those made in the present day.

The NFSA collection first started as the National Historical Film and Speaking Record Library (within the then Commonwealth National Library) in 1935, becoming an independent cultural organisation in 1984. On 3 October, Prime Minister Bob Hawke officially opened the NFSA's headquarters in Canberra.

History of the organisation

The work of the Archive can be officially dated to the establishment of the National Historical Film and Speaking Record Library (part of the then Commonwealth National Library, precursor to the National Library of Australia) by a Cabinet decision on 11 December 1935.

After being part of the National Library of Australia (NLA) and its predecessors for nearly 50 years, the National Film and Sound Archive was created as a separate Commonwealth collecting institution through an announcement in Parliament on 5 April 1984 that took immediate effect. At that time, an Advisory Committee was established to guide the institution.

On 21 June 1999, the name was changed to ScreenSound Australia, the National Collection of Screen and Sound, and changed again in early 2000 to ScreenSound Australia, National Screen and Sound Archive. It reverted to its original name, National Film and Sound Archive, in December 2004.

In 2000, Screensound joined the PANDORA Archive, the web archiving project started by the NLA in 1996, as a collaborating partner.

Meanwhile,  consequent on amendments to the Australian Film Commission Act which took effect on 1 July 2003, it ceased to be a semi-autonomous entity within the Department of Communications, Information Technology and the Arts and became an integrated branch, later a division, of the Australian Film Commission, a funding and promotional body.

In 2007, the Liberal Government announced the creation of a new agency to be called Screen Australia which would incorporate the main functions of the Film Finance Corporation, the Australian Film Commission (including the Archive), and Film Australia. Following elections in November 2007, however, the new Labor Government implemented an election promise to allow the NFSA to become a statutory authority, similar to other major cultural institutions including the National Library of Australia, the National Gallery of Australia and the National Museum of Australia. The NFSA Act became law on 20 March 2008 and came into effect on 1 July 2008, with celebrations held that day.

Inaugural Board

The Archive's first Board as a statutory authority comprised:

Professor Chris Puplick AM (Chair)
Associate Professor Deb Verhoeven (Deputy Chair)
Professor Jill Matthews
Ms Grace Koch
Ms Catherine Robinson
Mr Andrew Pike OAM
Mr Philip Mortlock

Board

Ms Caroline Elliot (Chair)
Mr Richard Bell
Mrs Lucinda Brogden
Ms Alison Cameron
Ms Toni Cody (Deputy Chair)
Ms Judith Donnelly
Mr Ewen Jones
Mr Kim Ledger
Mr Stephen Peach

History of the building 

The building to which the Archive moved in 1984 was the home of the Australian Institute of Anatomy from 1931-84. Originally it held the anatomy collection of Sir Colin MacKenzie.

The building is often classified as art deco, though its overall architectural style is technically "Late 20th Century Stripped Classical", the style of ancient Greece and Rome but simplified and modernised.  It features a symmetrical façade, a horizontal skyline, classical columns and a central entrance. The decorative foyer features images of native flora, fauna and Aboriginal art and motifs. Face masks of well-known scientists from the late 19th century and early 20th century are featured on the foyer’s walls as a reminder of its previous incarnation as the Institute of Anatomy.

The building also features a landscaped courtyard and theatre. In 1999, the building was extended to accommodate the Archive's growth. The new wing’s design is in keeping with the Art Deco style of the main structure with details and finishes to match the original look.

Collections 

The NFSA collection includes more than 3 million items, encompassing sound recordings, radio, television, film, video games and new media. In addition to discs, films, videos, audio tapes, phonograph cylinders and wire recordings, the collection includes supporting documents and artefacts, such as personal papers and organisational records, photographs, posters, lobby cards, publicity, scripts, costumes, props, memorabilia, and sound, video and film equipment.

Notable holdings include:
 The Cinesound Movietone Australian Newsreel Collection, 1929–1975, a comprehensive collection of 4,000 newsreel films and documentaries representing news stories covering all major events in Australian history, sport and entertainment from 1929 to 1975. Inscribed on the Australian Memory of the World Register in 2003.
 The Story of the Kelly Gang (1906),  directed by Charles Tait, is the first full-length narrative feature film produced anywhere in the world, and was inscribed onto the International Memory of the World Register in 2007.
 The earliest surviving Australian sound recording, "The Hen Convention", a novelty song by vocalist John James Villiers, with piano accompaniment, recorded by Thomas Rome in 1896, on Sounds of Australia.
 The earliest surviving film shot in Australia, Patineur Grotesque, footage of a man performing on rollerskates for a crowd in Prince Alfred Park, Sydney in 1896, shot by Marius Sestier.
 original costumes from Australian films such as The Adventures of Priscilla, Queen of the Desert, Muriel's Wedding, Picnic at Hanging Rock, and My Brilliant Career.

A 2010 study compared the curatorial practices of accessioning and cataloging for NFSA collections and for YouTube with regard to access to older Australian television programs. It found the NFSA to be stronger in current affairs and older programs, and YouTube stronger in game shows, lifestyle programs, and "human interest" material (births, marriages, and deaths). YouTube cataloging was found to have fewer broken links than the NFSA collection, and YouTube metadata could be searched more intuitively. The NFSA was found to generally provide more useful reference information about production and broadcast dates.

The NFSA announced plans to collect Australian-developed video games as part of its collection starting in 2019, with new titles to be added on an annual basis.

Special Collections 
 The Film Australia Collection contains a diverse range of more than 3,000 titles of Australian documentary and educational programs, spanning a century of Commonwealth documentary and docu-drama titles (1913–2008).
 Sounds of Australia (formerly the National Registry of Recorded Sound) is the NFSA's selection of sound recordings with cultural, historical and aesthetic significance and relevance, which inform or reflect life in Australia. It was established in 2007. Each year, the Australian public nominates new sounds to be added with final selections determined by a panel of industry experts.
 NFSA Restores is the NFSA's program to digitise, restore and preserve, at the highest archival standards, classic and cult Australian films so they can be seen on the big screen in today's digital cinemas.
 The Oral History Collection houses oral history recordings.
 The Non-Theatrical Lending Collection includes non-theatrical screenings, which take place on a non-commercial basis and are held by educational, cultural, social and religious institutions; community groups; churches; film societies; government bodies; hospitals; libraries; museums and galleries.
 Australian Jazz Archive

Australian Screen Online
Australian Screen Online (ASO), also known as Australian Screen or australianscreen, is an online database operated by the Australian National Film and Sound Archive (NFSA). It has both a promotional and educational function, providing free worldwide online access to information about Australian cinema and the television industry in Australia.

It provides information about and excerpts from a wide selection of Australian feature films, documentaries, television programs, newsreels, short films, animations, and home movies, provided by a collaboration of the NFSA with the National Archives of Australia, the Australian Broadcasting Corporation, SBS, and the Australian Institute of Aboriginal and Torres Strait Islander Studies (AIATSIS). The educational content is designed for teachers and students, and includes a collection of film clips accompanied by teachers’ notes and urators’ notes written by experts.

Since the initial launch of the website on 18 July 2007, with more than 1500 Australian film and TV clips, it has won numerous awards as an educational resource and for its website design. The website was revamped and re-launched in 2009, including new features such as exclusive interviews with filmmakers, a news section, forums, games, detailed profiles of producers, directors, screenwriters, film score composers and actors. At the time, it reported about 90,000 visitors per month to the website, with 25 per cent coming from outside Australia.

Awards

Ken G Hall Film Preservation Award
The Ken G Hall Film Preservation Award was established in 1995 as a tribute to producer/director Ken G Hall. It is presented in recognition of an individual, group, or organisation, for their outstanding contribution to the art of moving image and its preservation. It is presented to candidates where there is a significant link between their work and its impact or relationship to the Australian film industry. Examples of this contribution include technical innovation, scholarship in the field, involvement with the survival of film as an art form and as a cultural experience, advocacy, sponsorship and fundraising.

2012 Susanne Chauvel Carlsson
2011 David Hannay
2010 Patricia Lovell
2009 Ian Dunlop
2006 Paul Cox
2005 Phillip Noyce
2004 Graham Shirley
2003 Tom Nurse
2002 Judy Adamson
2001 Murray Forrest
2000 Anthony Buckley
1999 Joan Long
1998 Not awarded
1997 Kodak Australasia
1996 Peter Weir
1995 Alan Rydge and Rupert Murdoch

National Folk Recording Award
The NFSA National Folk Recording Award was established in 2001 to encourage and reward excellence in Australian folk music recording. Award entrants are selected from recordings submitted each year to the National Folk Festival in Canberra. The judging panel comprises representatives from the National Folk Festival, ABC Radio and the Archive.

2013 Not a Note Wasted by Luke R Davies and the Recycled String Band
2012 Carried in Mind by Jeff Lang
2011 Love and Sorrow by Kavisha Mazzella
2010 A Voice that was Still by Chloe and Jason Roweth, with Jim McWhinnie 	
2009 Urban Sea Shanties by Fred Smith and the Spooky Men's Chorale
2008 The Next Turn by Trouble in the Kitchen
2006 Diamond Wheel by Kate Fagan
2005 Songs of the Wallaby Track by Dave de Hugard
2004 The Fig Tree, a musical companion to Arnold Zable's book produced by The Boite
2003 Swapping Seasons by Kate Burke and Ruth Hazleton
2002 Bagarap Empires by Fred Smith
2001 Follow the Sun by Seaman Dan

Cochrane-Smith Award for Sound Heritage
The Cochrane-Smith Award for Sound Heritage recognises the achievements of a person who has made a substantial contribution to the preservation, survival and recognition of sound heritage. It is named for Fanny Cochrane Smith, who features on the only known recording of Tasmanian Aboriginal songs and language.

2012 Dr Ros Bandt
2011 Bill Armstrong
2010 Dr Karl Neuenfeldt

 Orlando Short Film Award 
The Orlando Short Film Award is an annual celebration of Australia’s best lesbian, gay, bisexual, transgender or intersex short films. It recognises the nation’s cultural diversity and the role screen culture plays within the broader community.

2012 Craig Boreham Writer and director of Drowning2011 Grant Scicluna Writer and director of Neon Skin''

Award for an Emerging Cinematographer
First presented in 2010, the NFSA Australian Cinematographers Society John Leake OAM Award for an Emerging Cinematographer is designed to enable emerging cinematographers to develop their craft, and is presented annually at the Australian Cinematographers Society   Awards. The Award is named in honour of Australian Cinematographers Society (ACS) co-founder and industry icon John Leake  (1927–2009). The judging panel comprises the Federal President of the Australian Cinematographers Society, the Chief Executive Officer of the National Film and Sound Archive, and two other executive members of the ACS.

2013 Dale Bremner
2012 Jimmy Ennett
2011 Edward Goldner
2010 Kirsty Stark

Preservation Award 
The South East Asia Pacific Audiovisual Archives Association (SEAPAVAA) NFSA Preservation Award recognises the extraordinary efforts of individuals or organisations within the South East Asia and Pacific region in preserving or promoting audiovisual archiving in the region. It is presented at the annual SEAPAVAA conference.

2012 Kae Ishihara

Exhibitions
The following exhibitions have been developed by the NFSA:
 The Art of Sound, in collaboration with regional art galleries
 Starstruck: Australian Movie Portraits, in partnership with the National Portrait Gallery of Australia. The exhibition premiered in Canberra from 10 November 2017 – 4 March 2018, followed by an Australian tour including Adelaide, Gold Coast, Bathurst and Geraldton.

From August 2018, the NFSA re-opened its exhibition gallery to present temporary exhibitions, including:
 Australians & Hollywood, from 21 January 2022 
 Heath Ledger: A Life In Pictures, from 10 August 2018 to 10 February 2019. Developed by the Western Australian Museum.
 The Dressmaker Costume Exhibition, from 18 April to 18 August 2019. Developed by FilmArt Media and curated by designer Marion Boyce.
 Game Masters: The Exhibition, from 27 September 2019 to 9 March 2020. Developed by the Australian Centre for the Moving Image.
 Mervyn Bishop: The Exhibition. Friday 5 March to Sunday 1 August 2021; 10am to 4pm, Monday to Sunday. This exhibition is drawn from the Art Gallery of New South Wales (AGNSW) collection, the artist’s private archive, and enriched by sound and moving image from the NFSA.

See also
List of music museums
Sounds of Australia

References

External links
National Film and Sound Archive
australianscreen online
   Accessed: 2008-04-22

NFSA Films (archive titles) - YouTube
NFSA (interviews) - YouTube
NFSA - SoundCloud

Commonwealth Government agencies of Australia
Australia
Film archives in Australia
Sound archives in Australia
Television archives
Archives in Australia
1984 establishments in Australia
Museums in Canberra
Cinema museums
Music museums in Australia
Film organisations in Australia
History of television in Australia
Television organisations in Australia
History of radio